Udara owgarra is a species of butterfly of the family Lycaenidae. It is found in New Guinea.

Subspecies
Udara owgarra owgarra (Papua New Guinea: Owgarra)
Udara owgarra mima (Joicey & Talbot, 1916) (West Irian: Wandammen Mountains)

References

Butterflies described in 1906
Udara